Człuchów - Słosinko line is a PKP railway line in Pomeranian Voivodship, Poland. In PKP D29 classification system the line was numbered 413 with a maximum allowed speed of 50 km/h.

History
The line was opened in 1902 was opened on route from Człuchów to Czosnowo, and later this year it reached Słosinko.

The whole line was closed for passenger transport in 1991, and one year later the part from Przechlewo to Słosinko was closed for all transport. The closed part is now partly dismantled or unavailable.

Stations on the line
Listed from east to west:

References 

 

Railway lines in Poland
Railway lines opened in 1902